Long Flat may refer to the following places:

 Long Flat, New South Wales
 Long Flat, Queensland, a locality in Gympie Region, Queensland, Australia
 Long Flat, South Australia